Hotel Tequendama & Centro de Convenciones (Convention Center) is an historic hotel in Bogotá, Colombia.  It is located in the San Diego neighborhood of the town of Santa Fe at the intersection of Tenth Avenue and Twenty-Sixth Avenue. The hotel, designed by Holabird & Root, John Burgee, and the Colombian architectural firm Cuéllar Serrano Gómez, was constructed between 1950 and 1951.  Between 1967 and 1970, the hotel was expanded to double its original size.

History
The Hotel Tequendama occupies the grounds of the former San Diego cloister, the Superior School of War, the Military School and the Ministry of Defense.  The hotel was the first building constructed in the Centro Internacional Tequendama complex. Its construction took place within the framework of the expansion of Tenth Avenue. When first constructed, the hotel adjoined the Centennial Park.  The hotel was the tallest building built in the city in the 1950s.

On May 17, 1953, Hotel Tequendama was inaugurated with a banquet attended by the President of Colombia, Roberto Urdaneta Arbeláez.  Between 1967 and 1970 an extension was built in the same style as that of the original building.  At this time, the hotel's main entrance was relocated to Tenth Avenue, the building was given a T-shaped plan, several conference rooms were added, and its capacity was doubled.  For more than 50 years, Hotel Tequendama was managed by the InterContinental Hotels Group (IHG) for the InterContinental Hotels and Resorts brand.  So, it was known until 2007 as Hotel InterContinental Tequendama.  That year it was announced that the hotel would switch to the Crowne Plaza brand of the Inter Continental Hotels Group (IHG).  So, the hotel was renamed Hotel Crowne Plaza Tequendama..  The hotel Is considered a national monument in Bogotá.

Etymology 
Tequendama is a word derived from the Chibcha language of the Muisca, who inhabited the Bogotá savanna in the times before the Spanish conquest. It means "he who precipitates downward".

Gallery

See also 

 Tequendama
 Tequendama Falls

References 

"In Bogota" - Joan Didion, _The White Album_

Bibliography

External links 

 

Buildings and structures in Bogotá
Tequendama
Tequendama
Hotels established in 1953
Hotel buildings completed in 1953